Into Oblivion is a video game written by Stephen N. Curtis and published by Mastertronic in 1986 for the Amstrad CPC.

Gameplay
The story is set in the aftermath of the destruction of an evil computer. Only its servants remain, from the planet Nonterraqueous, a location used by programmer Steven Curtis in the prequels Nonterraqueous (1985) and Soul of a Robot (1985). The player's objective is to find a safe planet amongst the 42 in the system.

The player controls a small vehicle, a "Mk II Seeker", which allows for exploration of the various screens. Joystick or keyboard can be used. The player is supplied with a laser beam to destroy various hazardous lifeforms, and nine lives. Each screen has a group of three enemies that follow different movement patterns. Some screens contain a spacecraft that transports the player to another planet.

Reception
Amstrad Action gave Into Oblivion an overall rating of 70%, highlighting the large number of screens and the exploration and mapping required to find the safe planet. However, the gameplay was criticized for the lack of excitement from obstacles and enemies.

References

External links
Information, screenshots, interview with the developer
CPC Game Reviews
CPC Power

1986 video games
Amstrad CPC games
Platform games
Video games developed in the United Kingdom
Mastertronic games